The team moving bird at 50 metres event was part of the archery programme at the 1920 Summer Olympics.  The event, like all other archery events in 1920, was open only to men.  Two teams of eight archers each competed.

Results

References

External links
 
 

Archery at the 1920 Summer Olympics